The Type 3 mine was a Japanese ceramic cased  landmine used during the Second World War. The mine contained approximately 3 kg of explosive and had a diameter of 27 cm. A wooden landmine using the same fuse was also produced towards the end of the war.

External links
 Pictures of the mine (Japanese language)

Land mines of Japan